Curchy-Dreslincourt is a former railway station located in the commune of Curchy in the Somme department, northern France. The station is located on the line from Amiens to Reims, between the stations of Chaulnes and Nesle. The station was closed in December 2007, and replaced by a taxi service to the station of Nesle.

See also
List of SNCF stations in Hauts-de-France

References

Defunct railway stations in Somme (department)
Railway stations closed in 2007
Railway stations in France opened in 1867